Augšzeme Protected Landscape is located in Augšdaugava Municipality, in the Selonia region of Latvia. Created in 1977 to preserve a very high landscape area, which includes  Sventes and  Medumu lakes with islands, as well as several small lakes around them. Sventes nature parks, Lake Bardinska, Islands of Lake Medumu, Lake Skujines and Islands of Lake Sventes reserves, as well as several other protected natural objects. Natura 2000 territory.

References 

Natura 2000 in Latvia
Nature parks in Latvia
Augšdaugava Municipality
Selonia